Monoammonium glutamate is a compound with formula NH4C5H8NO4. It is an ammonium acid salt of glutamic acid.

It has the E number E624 and is used as a flavor enhancer.

See also

 Monopotassium glutamate

Glutamates
Ammonium compounds
E-number additives